Gloria Thomas is a former international lawn and indoor bowls competitor for England.

Bowls career
In the 1960s, Thomas set up a ladies' section for her local bowling club in Helston. Thomas won a National Championships title in 1978.

In 1981 she won double gold in the fours with Eileen Fletcher, Mavis Steele, Betty Stubbings and Irene Molyneux and the team event (Taylor Trophy) and the bronze medal in the pairs at the 1981 World Outdoor Bowls Championship in Toronto. In 2003, she competed in the National Express EBWA triples championship.

References

1943 births
English female bowls players
Bowls World Champions
Living people